Idactus lateralis is a species of beetle in the family Cerambycidae. It was described by Gahan in 1898.

References

Ancylonotini
Beetles described in 1898